Brian Simnjanovski (May 29, 1981 – May 10, 2009) was a former NFL Europe punter for the Berlin Thunder, an American football team.

High School Years
Simnjanovski attended Escondido High School and was a student and a letterman in football and soccer and as a senior, he was named Escondido High School's co-Athlete of the Year. In football, he was an All-Valley selection. In soccer, he was a four-year letterman.  He played club soccer with FC San Diego (formerly San Diego Soccer Club, Pegasus) and the San Diego Nomads (formerly La Jolla Nomads).  During his club play he was selected as an Olympic Development Player and represented the western United States from 1996-1998.  Simnjanovski graduated from Escondido High School with Honors distinction.

College and professional years
A two-time academic all-conference pick who was named as a Verizon Academic All-American following his junior season... Coming off an impressive campaign... He had recorded two of the best single-season averages in school history... Also handled kickoff duties and battled for place-kicking assignments after a strong spring of putting the ball through the uprights... Was a valuable weapon for the San Diego State Aztecs ... Finished 14th nationally and topped in the Mountain West in punting his junior year...was on the Ray Guy Award watch list and was a strong contender for the honor in his senior year.  Simnjanovski the Aztecs' special teams player of the year his junior and senior years at SDSU.

2001: Averaged 43.6 yards per punt for the third best single-season average in the history of San Diego State - Had 14 punts that covered at least 50 yards and had another 22 downed inside the opposition's 20-yard-line -Best game of the season may have come at Arizona State... Averaged 47.4 yards on eight punts at ASU... Had four punts travel over 50 yards and four that were downed inside the 20 against the Sun Devils -Booted a 64-yarder in the field position battle at Colorado State and had nine kicks for a 46.8-yard average in Fort Collins.

2000: Handled every kickoff for the Aztecs, recording six touchbacks... Emerged as one of the nation's top punters and handled all but pooch-punt situations... Averaged 42.8 yards on 55 punts, including a 60-yarder at New Mexico, to rank second in the MWC and 14th nationally in punting... It was the seventh best average in school history... His 43.8-yard average during conference play led the league... In all, had nine punts travel over 50 yards... Placed six punts inside the 20-yard-line.

1999: Saw action all season as a walk-on, handling kickoff duties... Credited with two tackles.

In the 2006 season, his second with the Thunder, Simnjanovski ranked as the No. 4 punter in NFL Europe, averaging 39.5 yards per punt. He punted 50 times for a gross total of 1,974 yards with a long of 54 yards. He pinned opponents inside the 20 yard line on 18 occasions. Simnjanovski was allocated to the Berlin Thunder by the Tampa Bay Buccaneers of the National Football League. He participated in the Buccaneers' 2006 training camp before being released at the conclusion of the team's camp.

Personal
Simnjanovski was born May 29, 1981, in Escondido. He was the son of Macedonian immigrants, Djoko and Zorka Simnjanovski (Macedonian spelling of surname: Симњаковски), and was the younger brother of author and political theorist, Dr. Riste Simnjanovski (a California Baptist University Dean and Professor). Brian was also a second cousin to  Aztec place-kicker Tommy Kirovski; and Jovan Kirovski a former member of the U.S. national soccer team and current technical director of the Los Angeles Galaxy in Major League Soccer.  He was an undergraduate social science major, and had completed his teaching credential at California State University, San Marcos. He died six days before he was scheduled to receive his degree, on Mother's Day (May 10, 2009).

Death
Simnjanovski died May 10, 2009 after his Audi A4 3.0 sedan slammed into a tree at about 10 p.m PST. He was 27 years, 11 months and 11 days old. Simnjanovski was driving south on Valley Center Road in San Diego when his car swerved at a curve at Vesper Road, authorities said. Simnjanovski, who was a graduate student at California State University's San Marcos campus, was alone in the car and died on impact, according to the San Diego County medical examiner's office. Simnjanovski, who was single, is survived by his parents Djoko and Zorka Simnjanovski and his brother Dr. Riste Simnjanovski. The cause of death is unknown.

Notes

1981 births
2009 deaths
Road incident deaths in California
Players of American football from San Diego
American football punters
San Diego State Aztecs football players
Berlin Thunder players
Sportspeople from Escondido, California